"Perfect Stranger" is a song by British electronic music project Magnetic Man featuring singer Katy B. It is the second single to be released from their debut album Magnetic Man and can also be found on Katy B's debut album On a Mission. It was released on 1 October 2010. It peaked at number 16 on the UK Singles Chart.

Background
In an interview with The Guardian they said: "We worked on this song for two weeks to get the original version perfect. Then Benga does a remix that's absolutely amazing. I think it's testament to his talent that he can live so closely with a track and then do something completely different with it."

Critical reception
Nick Levine of Digital Spy gave the song a positive review stating:

Songs about spotting a proper fitty on the dancefloor and getting in a right old tizzy about it are as rare as OK! covers featuring Katie Price. Still, if anyone can eek fresh juice out of this well-squeezed lyrical lemon, it's the combined talents of a dubstep supergroup and the hippest pop singer in Croydon town, right?

Well, yes, actually. The cut-above club pop of 'Perfect Stranger' is simultaneously stately and spacious, with production that manages to sound clattering without feeling cluttered, and the vocals of Katy "No relation to Mel!" B are just as enchanting as they were when she went 'On A Mission' recently. It all adds up to our favourite song about love at first sight since Kylie chirped "Baby when I heard you..." Right, time for a new iTunes playlist.

Track listing

12" vinyl

Chart performance

Release history

References

Magnetic Man songs
Katy B songs
2010 singles
Songs written by Benga (musician)
Songs written by Skream
Songs written by Katy B
Song recordings produced by Magnetic Man
2010 songs
Columbia Records singles